Franz Berger (born 10 January 1958) is an Austrian judoka. He competed in the men's open category event at the 1980 Summer Olympics.

References

External links
 

1958 births
Living people
Austrian male judoka
Olympic judoka of Austria
Judoka at the 1980 Summer Olympics
Sportspeople from Tyrol (state)
20th-century Austrian people